Clare Wilkinson (born in Manchester, England) is an English mezzo-soprano specialising in Baroque and Renaissance music.

Her recent CD recordings are 
Mynstrelles with Straunge Sounds with the Rose Consort of Viols
Anne Boleyn's Songbook with Alamire
Bach's Magnificat with the Dunedin Consort
Adoramus Te with the Rose Consort of Viols

References

External links 
 

Year of birth missing (living people)
Living people
Singers from Manchester
English mezzo-sopranos
20th-century English singers
20th-century English women singers
21st-century English singers
21st-century English women singers
British performers of early music
Women performers of early music